Mario Sesé Vera (born 30 August 2002) is a Spanish footballer who plays as a right winger for Real Oviedo Vetusta.

Club career
Born in Quart de Poblet, Valencian Community, Sesé represented UD Quart de Poblet, Valencia CF, Levante UD, Patacona CF, CD Don Bosco and UD Alzira as a youth. After making his senior debut with the latter's reserves in 2021, he was promoted to the main squad in Segunda División RFEF on 16 June of that year.

Sesé made his first team debut for Alzira on 19 September 2021, coming on as a second-half substitute and scoring the opener in a 1–1 away draw against CD Eldense. On 11 June of the following year, after featuring regularly, he left the club after failing to agree new terms.

On 6 July 2022, Sesé signed for Real Oviedo and was initially assigned to the reserves also in the fourth tier. He made his first team debut on 30 November, starting in a 1–0 Segunda División away win over CD Tenerife.

References

External links
 
 
 

2002 births
Living people
People from Horta Oest
Sportspeople from the Province of Valencia
Spanish footballers
Footballers from the Valencian Community
Association football wingers
Segunda División players
Segunda Federación players
Tercera División players
Divisiones Regionales de Fútbol players
UD Alzira footballers
Real Oviedo Vetusta players
Real Oviedo players